Shongram is the soundtrack album to the 2014 film of the same name, written and directed by Munsur Ali. The album is the first soundtrack and third studio album by Boston-based Bangladeshi singer-songwriter and composer Armeen Musa.

Background
Director of the film Munsur Ali wrote a scene based on the song "Ey Shondhay", which Armeen Musa co-wrote with Saif Q in 2007 and featured on her 2008 debut album Aye Ghum Bhangai. Ali contacted Musa via Twitter for permission to use the song for the film in September 2011. Coincidentally, Musa was intending to visit London the following month, and after meeting in person, Ali offered her the job of soundtrack composer in December 2011. Subsequently, a pre-launch event was held at Rich Mix in London on 18 December 2011.

In March 2014, whilst speaking with Dhaka Tribune, Musa said, "...In the journey of this movie I got to explore various genres and discover my own abilities as a music director and I am really proud that my first film soundtrack was one about ‘71 [Bangladesh Liberation War]."

Recording and production
Recording started in December 2012 at Bengal Recording Studio in Dhaka, Bangladesh this included Nashid Kamal's vocals for "Rashmonchey Dol Dol", Gazi Abdul Hakim's flute for "Shongram Theme" and the full song of "Main Toh Huin Pareshan". The remaining tracks and mixing was accomplished at Liquid Sound Productions in Boston, Massachusetts. Recording was complete in November 2013.

Musa and Hadi were particularly nervous about arranging a Nazrul Geeti therefore they recorded three or four different versions of "Rashmonchey Dol Dol" (sung by her mother, Nashid Kamal) using electric guitars, acoustic guitars and strings, before choosing the final version. After completing the album, Musa was "especially excited" about the cajón and nylon string guitar fusion in the song.

Composition
The album contains seven songs (including a theme song) which are sung by Nashid Kamal, Kona, Armeen Musa, Nolok Babu, Razu and Zanita Ahmed Zilik. It also includes two instrumentals; "Shongram Theme" and "Ei Shondhay".

The tracks were composed by Armeen Musa and the background music score was composed by Emon Saha.

Release
A seven-track album was released by Laser Vision in Bangladesh on 18 March 2014. The album was launched at the Seven Hills Restaurant in Bangla Motor, Dhaka. Present at the event were musician Azad Rahman, filmmakers; Morshedul Islam, Majharul Islam and Khalid Mahmud Mithu, director of the film Munsur Ali, general secretary of Bangladesh Film Directors Association Mushfiqur Rahman Gulzar, media personality Mosrher-ul-Alam, A K M Arifur Rahman, Chairman of Laser Vision, actors and film crew.

A full nine-track edition of the album was made available for digital download internationally from June 2014.

Track listing

Notes
The lyrics for "Nodi Re" were collected locally.
The digital download edition of the album includes two bonus instrumental tracks.

Personnel

Musicians
Zak Dylan Wass – acoustic guitar, cajón
Saif Q – electric guitar
Ahsanul "Adil" Hadi – acoustic guitar
Layth Siddiq – violin
Franny King-Smith – piano
Gazi Abdul Hakim – flute
Eivind Lødemel – piano

Vocalists
Armeen Musa
Kona
Razu
Zanita Ahmed Zilik
Nashid Kamal
Nolok Babu
Patricia Moreno

Technical
Giosue Greco – mix engineer
Zak Dylan Wass – recording engineer
Shubho (Bengal) – recording engineer

See also
Artistic depictions of Bangladesh Liberation War

References

External links

Shongram at the Internet Movie Database

2014 soundtrack albums
Bengali-language soundtracks
Laser Vision albums
Aftermath of the Bangladesh Liberation War
Romance film soundtracks
Drama film soundtracks